Anass Haouam (born 24 January 1995), known professionally as 3robi, is a Dutch rapper of Moroccan origin. Born in Amsterdam, he started his musical career in 2013. His debut studio album, Jonge jongen naar de top, was released in 2017 and reached at number-one on the Dutch Album Top 100. In 2019, 3robi founded his own record label Spow Business and released his second album in the next year.

Early life 

Anass Haouam was born and raised in the suburbs of Amsterdam-West in Bos en Lommer, a neighborhood of Moroccan immigrants. He parents are originally from Casablanca, Morocco. From the age of twelve to nineteen, he resided in IJburg in Amsterdam-Oost. He has three brothers: Yassine, Sami and Aim. Yassine is a record producer and has produced multiple songs for him under the name YassineBeats. Sami is a football player, while Aim is a rapper and constantly collaborates with him. Anass was given the nickname 3robi in his teenage years by his friends, being the only Moroccan from Casablanca in his neighborhood. It designates the inhabitants of the countryside which surrounds his town of origin. In his youth he was interested in rap and football, and was inspired by Dutch rappers Sjaak and Naffer.

Career

2013–2018: Beginnings and Jonge jongen naar de top
Starting his career in 2013, 3robi achieved his first success in 2017 with the single "Sinds een puber" featuring LouiVos and Kingsize, which reached at number 97 in the Dutch Single Top 100. Since then 3robi collaborated with artists such as Mula B, Dopebwoy and Yung Felix. In 2017, he was featured on the single "Cartier" by Dopebwoy along with Chivv, which peaked at number five in the Dutch chart and has become his highest charting single in the country so far.

In December 2017, he released his debut album titled Jonge jongen naar de top, which reached at number-one on the Dutch Album Top 100.

2019–present: Jonge jongen naar de top 2
In 2019, after leaving the Wild West record label, 3robi established his own Spow Business label. The first artist that was signed was his brother Aim. While talking about leaving Wild West, 3robi said: "I thought if I put in more effort, I can fix it all myself. I have a vision and everything I've achieved so far, I've done myself. Also with help, but I did it myself. There is no help in the Netherlands to make us bigger artists. There is not really a label that grabs you and immediately wants to make you a star. It is always more for themselves. [...] I have been an artist for many years now and i have been to so many places. I can do it myself man."

In 2020, his second album, Jonge jongen naar de top 2, was released. In 2022, 3robi released the collaborative album Flex Mood with record producer SRNO.

Discography

Studio albums

Collaborative albums

Awards and nominations

References

External links
 3robi at AllMusic
 

1995 births
Living people
Dutch people of Moroccan descent
Dutch rappers
People from Amsterdam